Eric Nelsen (born June 26, 1991) is an Emmy and Tony Award-winning American actor and producer. He is known for his work as an actor in the television series 1883. On stage, Nelsen portrayed Brett Sampson in the original Broadway production of 13, and he starred in The Good Mother (produced by The New Group). He has appeared in over 30 television series, including as a series regular in the Hulu revival of All My Children, a recurring role in The Affair on Showtime, The Blacklist, Girls, The Following, NCIS, Blue Bloods, and iCarly. Nelsen also appeared in the Universal Pictures film A Walk Among the Tombstones opposite Academy Award nominee Liam Neeson, and in Coming Through the Rye opposite Academy Award winner Chris Cooper.

In 2018, Nelsen most recently won a Daytime Emmy Award for Outstanding Supporting Actor in a Digital Daytime Drama Series for his work on the Amazon web series The Bay. As a producer, Nelsen has won three Daytime Emmys for The Bay and a Tony Award for the Broadway play The Inheritance. He also produced the indie feature Wakefield starring Bryan Cranston and Jennifer Garner.

At age 23, Nelsen became the youngest producer in history to win an Emmy Award.

Personal life
Nelsen is a native of West Palm Beach, Florida. He moved to New York City with his family at the age of 13. Eric married actress Sainty Reid (now Nelsen) in Fort Worth, Texas on November 29, 2013 and his wife gave birth to their daughter Molly Morgan Nelsen on October 1, 2019 in Los Angeles, California.

Filmography

Broadway

Awards and nominations

References

External links

1991 births
Living people
Daytime Emmy Award winners
American male film actors
American male television actors
American male stage actors
American male musical theatre actors
American male voice actors
20th-century American male actors
American male soap opera actors
People from West Palm Beach, Florida